Iven Kevin Patrick Moise (born 18 October 1990) is a Seychellois long-distance runner.

In 2017, he competed in the senior men's race at the 2017 IAAF World Cross Country Championships held in Kampala, Uganda. He finished in 112th place.

In 2019, he competed in the senior men's race at the 2019 IAAF World Cross Country Championships held in Aarhus, Denmark. He finished in 130th place. In 2019, he also represented Seychelles at the 2019 African Games held in Rabat, Morocco. He competed in the men's 5000 metres and he finished in 25th place.

References

External links 
 

Living people
1990 births
Place of birth missing (living people)
Seychellois male long-distance runners
Seychellois male cross country runners
Athletes (track and field) at the 2019 African Games
African Games competitors for Seychelles